The SMU Mustangs football statistical leaders are individual statistical leaders of the SMU Mustangs football program in various categories, including passing, rushing, receiving, total offense, defensive stats, kicking, and scoring. Within those areas, the lists identify single-game, single-season, and career leaders. The Mustangs represent Southern Methodist University in the NCAA's American Athletic Conference.

Although SMU began competing in intercollegiate football in 1915, the school's official record book considers the "modern era" to have begun in 1945. Records from before this year are often incomplete and inconsistent, and they are generally not included in these lists.

These lists are dominated by more recent players for several reasons:
 Since 1945, seasons have increased from 10 games to 11 and then 12 games in length.
 The NCAA didn't allow freshmen to play varsity football until 1972 (with the exception of the World War II years), allowing players to have four-year careers.
 Bowl games only began counting toward single-season and career statistics in 2002. The Mustangs have played in six bowl games since this decision, giving many recent players an extra game to accumulate statistics.
 Due to COVID-19 disruptions, the NCAA ruled that the 2020 season would not be counted against any football player's athletic eligibility, giving players active in that season five years of eligibility instead of the standard four.

These lists are updated through SMU's game against BYU on December 17, 2022.

Passing

Passing yards

Passing touchdowns

Rushing

Rushing yards

Rushing touchdowns

Receiving

Receptions

Receiving yards

Receiving touchdowns

Total offense
Total offense is the sum of passing and rushing statistics. It does not include receiving or returns.

Total offense yards

Touchdowns responsible for
In official NCAA records, "touchdowns responsible for" includes rushing and passing touchdowns, but not receptions or returns—the same statistical categories used to measure total offense.

Defense

Interceptions

Tackles

Sacks

Kicking

Field goals made

Field goal percentage

Scoring

Total points

Total touchdowns 
These lists include touchdowns scored by each individual player, thus including rushing, receiving, and return touchdowns but not passing touchdowns. SMU does not break down its lists of total touchdown leaders by type of play. It lists only the top 8 for career touchdowns and top 6 for single-season touchdowns.

Footnotes

References

SMU